Club Atlético Obras Sanitarias de la Nación (mostly known simply as Obras Sanitarias or Obras) is an Argentine professional sports club that is located in the district of Núñez, Buenos Aires. Although originally conceived as a rugby union club, Obras Sanitarias is mostly known for its basketball team, which currently plays in the Liga Nacional de Básquet, which is the first division of the Argentine basketball league system. Apart from basketball and rugby union, other disciplines practiced at the club are chess, judo, swimming, table tennis, and tennis.

Obras Sanitarias has been nicknamed Los Tacheros, a lunfardo word used to refer to Argentine taxi drivers, due to the fact that taxi cabs are painted in black and yellow, which are the same colors of Obras' jersey uniforms.

History
Obras Sanitarias was founded in 1917, by employees of the state-owned water supply company, "Obras Sanitarias de la Nación". On March 22, 1925, the club opened its sports facilities, allowing members to practice athletics, basque pelota, bowls, football, rugby union, swimming and tennis there. In 1941, Obras inaugurated its headquarters in the city of Buenos Aires, for the practice of indoor sports.

In 1978, Obras inaugurated its indoor arena, named Estadio Obras Sanitarias, and two years later, the first synthetic field hockey pitch in South America.

Basketball 

Obras Sanitarias, along with the Brazilian clubs Sírio and Flamengo, and the Venezuelan club Guaros de Lara is one of only four South American basketball clubs that have won the FIBA Intercontinental Cup title. Obras did so in the 1983 FIBA Intercontinental Cup, by defeating the Italian League club Jollycolombani Cantù. In February 2012, Obras won the South American League championship for the first time, after winning the 2011 edition of the tournament, after beating the Brazilian club Pinheiros, by a score of 88–73 in the final.

Current roster

Notable players 

 / Pablo Prigioni
  Lazaro Borrell
  Rolando Frazer
  Mario Butler
  Norton Barnhill
  Maurice Kemp 
  Charles Smith

Rugby union

The club's rugby installations are located in La Matanza Partido, of Greater Buenos Aires. The club was affiliated to the Unión de Rugby de Buenos Aires in 1917, soon after its establishment.

In 1953, Obras won the Unión de Rugby de Buenos Aires (URBA) championship, which is its only title to date. For that tournament, Obras formed a squad that was a mixture of experienced players, along with young talents that had won the reserves championship two years before, with 8 players being promoted to the senior team. During the tournament, Obras Sanitarias only lost one match (versus Hindú by a score of 11–3). In the penultimate round of the tournament, when Obras beat Pucará, by a score of 5–0, with a try conversion by Alberto Dramis.

With Olivos keeping the club's chances to get the title alive, Obras achieved another win versus Deportiva Francesa, in the last fixture, winning the championship with no sharing of the title. The top scorer was Alberto Bublath, with 27 points.

Obras Sanitarias currently plays in the Torneo de Tercera, which is the 6th division of the URBA league system. The club also has a women's rugby team, which competes in the "Torneo Femenino", which is organized by the same governing body.

Titles

Basketball
Campeonato Argentino de Clubes (3): 1975, 1976, 1982
FIBA Intercontinental Cup (1): 1983
Liga Sudamericana (1): 2011
Torneo InterLigas (1): 2011
Torneo Nacional de Ascenso (1): 1996

Rugby union
Torneo de la URBA (1): 1953

References

External links

 

Basketball teams in Argentina
Basketball teams established in 1917
o
Rugby clubs established in 1917
Women's rugby union teams in Argentina
1917 establishments in Argentina